Majorwala  is a village in Kapurthala district of Punjab State, India. The village is administrated by a Sarpanch, who is an elected representative.

Demography 
According to the report published by Census India in 2011, Majorwala has 20 houses with the total population of 115 persons of which 51 are male and 64 females. Literacy rate of  Majorwala is 81.63%, higher than the state average of 75.84%.  The population of children in the age group 0–6 years is 115 which is 14.78% of the total population.  Child sex ratio is approximately 1429, higher than the state average of 846.

Population data

References

External links
  Villages in Kapurthala
 Kapurthala Villages List

Villages in Kapurthala district